Swedish National Socialist Unity was a Skåne-based Nazi political party in Sweden. Swedish National Socialist Unity was formed by party branches in Skåne of the Swedish National Socialist Party, that had taken part in a rebellion against the party leader Birger Furugård. Nasisten was the organ of the group. The group used a swastika as its symbol. The group merged into the National Socialist Bloc later the same year.

References

Defunct political parties in Sweden
Nationalist parties in Sweden
1933 establishments in Sweden
Political parties established in 1933
Nazi parties
Political parties disestablished in 1933